Yuxarı Daşkəsən is a village and municipality in the Dashkasan District of Azerbaijan. The village had an Armenian population before the exodus of Armenians from Azerbaijan after the outbreak of the Nagorno-Karabakh conflict.

Toponymy 
The village is also known as Verin Karagat and Verkhniy Dashkesan.

Demographics 
The village has a population of 1,748.

References

External links 

Populated places in Dashkasan District